Alexander (or Alexandre)  'Alex' Kouassi Kouame (born 28 December 1988) is an Ivorian footballer who currently plays as a forward for Leopards.

Club career
Kouame joined Kenyan side Leopards in 2020.

Career statistics

Club

Notes

References

1988 births
Living people
Ivorian footballers
Ivorian expatriate footballers
Association football forwards
Accra Hearts of Oak S.C. players
RoundGlass Punjab FC players
A.F.C. Leopards players
Ghana Premier League players
I-League players
Ivorian expatriate sportspeople in Morocco
Expatriate footballers in Morocco
Expatriate footballers in Ghana
Ivorian expatriate sportspeople in India
Expatriate footballers in India
Expatriate footballers in Kenya
Calcutta Football League players